The Best of Eddy Raven is the first compilation album by the American country music artist of the same name. It was released in February 1988 via RCA Records. The album includes the singles "I'm Gonna Get You", "Joe Knows How to Live" and "'Til You Cry".

Content
In addition to several of Raven's previous hit singles, the album contains three new tracks. These are "I'm Gonna Get You", "Joe Knows How to Live", and "'Til You Cry". All three were released as singles in 1988. The former two reached number one on the Billboard Hot Country Songs charts, while the latter peaked at number four. "I'm Gonna Get You" was previously a charted single for Billy Swan in 1987, while "Joe Knows How to Live" was previously cut by the Nitty Gritty Dirt Band on their album Hold On. Session keyboardist Barry Beckett produced these three songs. Prior to the recording, Beckett had contacted Raven and asked to produce songs for him. While Beckett had played keyboard on Raven's earlier albums, Raven said he was unaware at the time that Beckett also worked as a producer, and agreed to let him produce after discovering other songs he liked on which Beckett was a producer.

Track listing

Chart performance

References

1988 compilation albums
Eddy Raven albums
Albums produced by Barry Beckett
Albums produced by Paul Worley
RCA Records compilation albums